Nemosinga is a genus of East African orb-weaver spiders first described by Lodovico di Caporiacco in 1947.  it contains only three species, all found in Tanzania.

References

Endemic fauna of Tanzania
Araneidae
Araneomorphae genera
Spiders of Africa